Columbia Heat is a defunct soccer club which spent three seasons in the USISL.

History
In 1993, the Columbia Spirit entered the USISL.  Following the 1993 season, the team was renamed the Columbia Heat.  In 1995, the USISL split into two leagues, the Professional and Premier (Amateur) Leagues.  Columbia spent the season in the Premier League before withdrawing and folding at the end of the season.  The team played in Columbia, South Carolina; at the University of South Carolina, on Eugene E. Stone III Stadium.

Year-by-year

External links
 1993 USISL Standings
 1994-1995 USISL

Defunct soccer clubs in South Carolina
USISL teams
1993 establishments in South Carolina
1995 disestablishments in South Carolina
Association football clubs established in 1993
Association football clubs disestablished in 1995